The 2020 Indian Premier League, also known as IPL 13 and branded as Dream11 Indian Premier League 2020, was the thirteenth season of the IPL, a professional Twenty20 cricket (T20) league established by the Board of Control for Cricket in India (BCCI) in 2008. The tournament was originally scheduled to commence on 29 March 2020, but was suspended until 15 April due to the COVID-19 pandemic. After Indian Prime Minister Narendra Modi announced on 14 April that the lockdown in India would last until at least 3 May 2020, the BCCI suspended the tournament indefinitely. On 2 August 2020, it was announced that the tournament would be played between 19 September and 10 November 2020 in the United Arab Emirates.The tagline was Ab Khel bolega: (Now game will speak.)

On 4 August 2020, Vivo pulled out as the title sponsor of the Indian Premier League (IPL) for the 2020 edition.

Defending champions Mumbai Indians successfully retained their title with a five-wicket win over Delhi Capitals in the final on 10 November 2020.

Background
The BCCI released the fixture details on 18 February 2020. The league stage was scheduled to start on 29 March 2020, with the opening match between Mumbai Indians and Chennai Super Kings, the finalists of the previous season, at Wankhede Stadium in Mumbai. However, due to the coronavirus pandemic, Maharashtra Chief Minister Uddhav Thackeray announced on 12 March that IPL matches can be held in the state only if they are played in empty stadiums. Deputy Chief Minister of Delhi Manish Sisodia declared that no IPL matches will be held in Delhi.

On 13 March, the BCCI suspended the tournament until 15 April, in view of the ongoing coronavirus pandemic. The decision regarding the postponement was reached by the Governing Council after a meeting with the owners of all eight franchise teams. On 9 April, with India under a nationwide lockdown, a BCCI official told CNBC TV18 that the Board was considering hosting the tournament in July or during the winter, possibly behind closed doors. On 14 April 2020, Indian Prime Minister Narendra Modi said that the lockdown in India would last until at least 3 May 2020, with the tournament postponed further. The following day, the BCCI suspended the tournament indefinitely due to the pandemic.

On 17 April 2020, Sri Lanka Cricket offered to host the tournament. On 17 May 2020, the Indian government relaxed nationwide restrictions on sports events, allowing events to take place behind closed doors. On 24 May, Indian sports minister Kiren Rijiju stated that the decision on whether or not to allow the tournament to be conducted in 2020 will be made by the Indian government based on "the situation of the pandemic". News reports on 17 July suggested that the BCCI was considering hosting the tournament in the United Arab Emirates between the tentative dates of 26 September and 7 November.

After the International Cricket Council (ICC) postponed the 2020 edition of the Men's T20 World Cup, the BCCI sought Government of India's permission to move the tournament to the UAE. On 24 July 2020, IPL Governing Council chairman Brijesh Patel said that the tournament would be played in the UAE between 19 September and 10 November, should it get the nod from Government of India. On 10 August 2020, the Government of India gave its permission for the tournament to take place in the UAE. The full fixtures for the tournament were confirmed on 6 September 2020.

Rules and regulations
Some of the rules were changed for the 2020 edition of the IPL.
Players will not be allowed to use saliva to shine the ball.
All the matches will be played without an audience.
Captains will not shake hands after the toss.
Front foot no-balls will be adjudicated by the third umpire rather than the on-field umpire.
 Teams will be allowed replacements if a player tests positive for COVID-19.
 If a Super Over is a tie, subsequent Super Overs shall be played until there is a winner.

Mid-season transfer
For the first time in IPL history, mid-season transfer was introduced. In mid-season transfer, teams can transfer players between teams like the European football leagues. For the mid-season transfer to begin, all teams must have played 7 matches. Then for a player to be transferred, the player should have played a maximum 2 matches. The player can be capped or uncapped and both Indian and International players can be transferred.

Personnel changes

Kings XI Punjab's captain Ravichandran Ashwin was transferred to Delhi Capitals in November 2019. Ajinkya Rahane, Trent Boult and Mayank Markande got salary raises during pre-auction trades. The released players were announced on 15 November 2019. Robin Uthappa, Yuvraj Singh and Chris Lynn were the most prominent names among the released players. Jaydev Unadkat, the costliest Indian player in 2019 auction, was also released. There were 12 transfers between teams during the 2020 transfer window.

The players auction for the 2020 season was held on 19 December 2019 in Kolkata. On 18 August, Delhi Capitals signed Anrich Nortje to replace Chris Woakes. On 31 August, Royal Challengers Bangalore bought Adam Zampa as a replacement for Kane Richardson. On 2 September, Australian fast bowler James Pattinson was named as a replacement for Lasith Malinga. On 12 September, Ali Khan became the first American cricketer to join IPL after he was selected as the replacement for Harry Gurney in Kolkata Knight Riders. Mitchell Marsh injured himself during Sunrisers Hyderabad's first match and was hence ruled out of the tournament. Jason Holder was named as his replacement.

Personnel and sponsorship

Venues

Teams and standings

Points table

Match summary

League stage

The schedule for the league stages of the 2020 season was published on the official IPL website on 6 September. The schedule for playoffs was announced later on 25 October 2020.

Matches

Playoffs

Preliminary 

Qualifier 1

Eliminator

Qualifier 2

Final

Statistics

Most runs

  K. L. Rahul of Kings XI Punjab received the Orange Cap.

Most wickets

  Kagiso Rabada of Delhi Capitals received the Purple Cap.

End of the season awards

 Source:

References

External links
 Series home at ESPN Cricinfo

 
Indian Premier League
Indian Premier League seasons
Indian Premier League